The Alps is a 2007 American documentary film about the climbing of the north face of the Eiger in the Bernese Alps by John Harlin III, son of John Harlin who died on the same ascent 40 years earlier. It was shot in 70mm IMAX.

Cast
 Michael Gambon, Narrator
 John Harlin III as himself
 Robert Jasper as himself
 Daniela Jasper as herself
 Adele Hammond as herself
 Siena Harlin as herself
 Bruno Messerli as himself
 Beatrice Messerli as herself
 Christine Pielmeier as herself

See also
 Swiss Alps
 Everest, Imax film produced by Greg MacGillivray

References

External links
 
 
 

2007 short documentary films
2007 films
American sports documentary films
Documentary films about climbing
Eiger
IMAX documentary films
IMAX short films
MacGillivray Freeman Films films
Short films directed by Greg MacGillivray
2000s English-language films
2000s American films
American short documentary films